Robert Marc Mazo is a theoretical physical chemist who specialized in statistical mechanics. Educated at Harvard and Yale, he was a research associate at the University of Chicago, and  he taught at the California Institute of Technology prior to joining the University of Oregon faculty in 1962. He was designated a professor emeritus in 1996. He is a member of the American Association of University Professors and a Fellow of the American Physical Society.

Early life and education 
Robert Marc Mazo, born in 1930 in Brooklyn, New York, is the son of Nathan and Rose Marion (Mazo) Mazo. While in high school in 1948, Mazo won the Seventh Science Talent Search with the project, "Reactions in Liquid Ammonia".

Mazo completed a A.B. at Harvard University in 1952, and an M.S. in Science at Yale University in 1953. With NSF fellowship funding, he earned a Doctor of Philosophy degree at Yale University in 1955, with his dissertation, Theoretical Studies On Low Temperature Phenomena, advised by Lars Onsager and John Gamble Kirkwood.

Mazo and Joan Ruth Spector wed in 1954, and their family includes a daughter and two sons.

Career 
Before joining the faculty of the University of Oregon in 1962, Mazo was a postdoctoral fellow at Institute voor Theoretische Physica, University of Amsterdam and a research associate at the University of Chicago (sponsored by the National Science Foundation). He also held an assistant professorship at the California Institute of Technology.

Mazo's research interests were "Exclusively theoretical", and have included "Brownian motion processes, Markov processes, Probabilities, Statistical mechanics, and Transport theory."

During Mazo's 33 year career at the University of Oregon, he served at various times as chair of the chemistry department, director of the Institute Theoretical Science, and as associate dean of the graduate school. He was also a program director of the National Science Foundation.

Selected publications

Books

Articles

Awards, honors 
 Alfred P. Sloan Fellow, 1961-65
 NSF Senior Postdoctoral Fellow, 1968-69
 Heinrich Hertz Fellow (West Germany)
 Meyerhoff Fellow (Israel)
 Fellow of the American Physical Society, citation: For his many contributions to the statistical mechanics of transport processes, especially to the understanding of Brownian motion and the couplings of moving molecules, 1983.

References 

1930 births
Harvard University alumni
California Institute of Technology faculty
Fellows of the American Physical Society
Physical chemists
Theoretical physicists
University of Oregon faculty
Yale University alumni
Living people